Gordon Fode (born 5 August 1971) is a former Australian rules footballer who played with St Kilda in the Victorian Football League (VFL).

Fode was a talented athlete in several sports, athletics, tennis, & junior soccer, played for Sandringham JSC, until age 13.
When he turned 14, was asked to join U19 St. Kilda FC, Recruiting Officer John Beverage, asked him to come down to trial, & was selected in U19 Squad, with teammate Robert Harvey, Brett Bowey, Brad Pearce, Jason Daniels and the great Shane Warne.

Fode made his debut, just turned 17-year-old, in the last round of the 1988 VFL season youngest debutant in that year.
He was then Selected to represent Victorian U15 All Schoolboys Championships, & Victorian U17 Teal Cup squad, with making All U17 Australian Team, playing alongside teammate Robert Harvey, & other greats such as, Wayne Carey, Chris Naish, Jose Romero. 
1989 He went on to play all 22 games the following season, before hamstring injuries restricted him to only 4 games in the next two seasons. 
Coach -  Ken Sheldon, moves Fode into a forward Line, off defence during the 1993 AFL season saw him kick 17 goals from 11 matches, and he was part of a 4 pronged attaching forward line, next to the great  Tony Lockett, Stewart Loewe, and Craig O’Brien, Peter Everit, all important players at St Kilda's future.  

However, after only nine games in 1994, and 5 in 1995, he left St Kilda, and joined  Hawthorn drafted Fode with the 5th selection in the 1996 Pre-season draft, played in reserves all year 1996 AFL Centenary, and only managed a few senior games, AFL pre-season, but never managed senior game for AFL, at Hawthorn.

He retired young, aged 27, from the VFL/AFL at the end of the 1996 AFL season and attempted to go back to play soccer, scoring goals playing for Chelsea Hajduk (Croatian team) & then trying out for the NSL league Melbourne Knights but he was overlooked for a contract with the Melbourne Knights.

 Fode's father Marko Fode was a goalkeeper for NSL League [A League] today, and still holds [NSL League/A League] record for the most consecutive games [11 matches] in a row, without ball in back of net.Fode's father, went onto to play for two clubs [J.U.S.T Footscray FC] & then winning national league Cup titles, with [South Melbourne FC] 4 premiership Dockety Cups, alongside great players Jimmy Armstrong, Steve Kennedy, & Walker. Marko Fode was inducted into [South Melbourne FC] Hall of Fame. He also representative Victoria as goalkeeper. Mother, Georgina Fode was a great swimmer, coached by the great former St.Kilda FC player, Neil Roberts, at school college days.

References

External links

Interview with Saints Footy

1971 births
Australian rules footballers from Victoria (Australia)
St Kilda Football Club players
Living people